The Mesopotamian campaign was a campaign in the Middle Eastern theatre of World War I fought between the Allies represented by the British Empire, troops from Britain, Australia and the vast majority from British India, against the Central Powers, mostly the Ottoman Empire.

Background
The Ottoman Empire had conquered the region in the early 16th century, but never gained complete control. Regional pockets of Ottoman control through local proxy rulers maintained the Ottomans' reach throughout Mesopotamia (modern Iraq). With the turn of the 19th century came reforms. Work began on a Baghdad Railway in 1888; by 1915 it had only four gaps, and travel time from Istanbul to Baghdad had fallen to 21 days.

The Anglo-Persian Oil Company (APOC) had obtained exclusive rights to petroleum deposits throughout the Persian Empire, except in the provinces of Azerbaijan, Ghilan, Mazendaran, Asdrabad, and Khorasan. In 1914, months before the war began, the British government contracted with the APOC to supply oil for the Royal Navy.

The operational area of the Mesopotamian campaign was limited to the lands watered by the rivers Euphrates and Tigris River. The main challenge was moving troops and supplies through the swamps and deserts which surrounded the area of conflict.

Shortly after the European war started, the British Army sent a military force to protect Abadan, the site of one of the world's earliest oil refineries. British operational planning included landing troops in the Shatt-al-Arab. The reinforced 6th (Poona) Division of the British Indian Army was assigned the task, designated as Indian Expeditionary Force D (IEFD).

Aside from oil, a major British interest in Mesopotamia, especially in the view of politicians like Austen Chamberlain (Secretary of State for India) and former Viceroy Lord Curzon, was in maintaining British prestige in the eyes of India's Muslim population. At first campaign planning was run by the India Office and Indian Army, with little input from the War Office.

The Ottoman Fourth Army was located in the region. It was composed of two corps: the XII Corps, with the 35th and 36th Divisions at Mosul, and XIII Corps, with the 37th and 38th Divisions at Baghdad.

On 29 October 1914, Ottoman warships commanded by the German admiral Wilhelm Souchon, bombarded several Russian Black Sea ports, prompting a Russian declaration of war on 2 November 1914, with Britain and France following suit on 5 November.

With the Ottoman Empire now at war with the principal allied powers, its priorities included the Caucasus Campaign against Russia, with the Ottoman war minister, Enver Pasha sending the 37th Division and XIII Corps Headquarters to this theatre in support of the Third Army. The entire XII Corps was deployed to the Sinai and Palestine Campaign. Fourth Army Headquarters was sent to Syria, to replace the Second Army Headquarters, which was sent to Istanbul. In place of the Fourth Army was the "Iraq Area Command" with only the 38th Division under its command.

Mesopotamia was a low priority area for the Ottomans, and they did not expect any major action in the region. Regiments of the XII and XIII Corps were maintained at low levels in peacetime. Lieutenant Colonel Süleyman Askerî Bey became the commander. He redeployed portions of the 38th Division at the mouth of Shatt-al-Arab. The rest of the defensive force was stationed at Basra. The Ottoman General Staff did not even possess a proper map of Mesopotamia. They tried to draw a map with the help of people who had worked in Iraq before the war, although this attempt failed. Enver Pasha bought two German maps scaled 1/1,500,000.

Operations

1914

On 6 November 1914, British offensive action began with the naval bombardment of the old fort at Fao, located at the point where the Shatt-al-Arab meets the Persian Gulf. At the Fao Landing, the British Indian Expeditionary Force D (IEF D), comprising the 6th (Poona) Division led by Lieutenant General Arthur Barrett with Sir Percy Cox as Political Officer, was opposed by 350 Ottoman troops and 4 guns. After a sharp engagement, the fort was overrun, killing many enemy troops. By mid-November the Poona Division was fully ashore and began moving towards the city of Basra.

The same month, the ruler of Kuwait, Sheikh Mubarak Al-Sabah, contributed to the Allied war effort by sending forces to attack Ottoman troops at Umm Qasr, Safwan, Bubiyan, and Basra. In exchange the British government recognised Kuwait as an "independent government under British protection." There is no report on the exact size and nature of Mubarak's attack, though Ottoman forces did retreat from those positions weeks later. Mubarak soon removed the Ottoman symbol from the Kuwaiti flag and replaced it with "Kuwait" written in Arabic script. Mubarak's participation and previous exploits in obstructing the completion of the Baghdad railway helped the British safeguard the Persian Gulf by preventing Ottoman and German reinforcement.

On 22 November, the British occupied the city of Basra after a short fight with soldiers of the Iraq Area Command under Suphi Bey, the Governor of Basra. The Ottoman troops abandoned Basra and retreated up the river. After establishing order in the town the English forces continued their advance, and at the Battle of Qurna they succeeded in capturing Subhi Bey and 1,000 of his troops. This put the British in a very strong position, ensuring that Basra and the oilfields would be protected from any Ottoman advance. The main Ottoman army, under the overall command of Khalil Pasha, was located 275 miles to the north-west around Baghdad. They made only weak efforts to dislodge the British.

1915

On 2 January, Süleyman Askerî Bey took over as head of the Iraq Area Command. With Gallipoli, the Caucasus, and Palestine taking priority, the Ottoman Army had few resources to move to Mesopotamia. Süleyman Askerî Bey sent letters to Arab sheiks in an attempt to organise them to fight against the British. He wanted to retake the Shatt-al-Arab region at any cost.

Early on the morning of 12 April, Süleyman Askerî attacked the British camp at Shaiba in what became known as the Battle of Shaiba. He had about 4,000 regular troops and about 14,000 Arab irregulars provided by Arab sheiks. Although the irregulars proved ineffective, the Ottoman infantry launched a series of relentless attacks on the fortified British camp and later attempted by bypass it. When the British cavalry and infantry counterattacked the defensive forces Suleyman Askari pulled his troops back. The next day the British attacked his defensive positions. It was a hard fought infantry battle in which the British infantry overcame tough Ottoman opposition. Ottoman losses numbered 2400 men killed, wounded, or taken prisoner, as well as two artillery field pieces. The retreat ended 75 miles up the river at Hamisiye. Süleyman Askerî had been wounded at Shaiba. Disappointed and depressed, he shot himself at the hospital in Baghdad. In his place Colonel Nureddin was appointed commander of the Iraq Area Command on 20 April 1915. Nureddin was one of the few officers to reach high command without the benefit of a staff college education. He did, however, have extensive combat experience.

Due to the unexpected success British command reconsidered their plan and General Sir John Nixon was sent in April 1915 to take command. He ordered Charles Vere Ferrers Townshend to advance to Kut or even to Baghdad if possible. Townshend and his small army advanced up the Tigris river. They defeated several Ottoman forces sent to halt him. In July 1915, a force led by G. F. Gorringe captured the city of Nasiriyah, capturing the Turks' largest supply depot in southern Mesopotamia. Although his advance was very difficult to sustain logistically, it was maintained.

In late September 1915, amidst the recent defeat of Serbia and entry of Bulgaria into the war and concerns about German attempts to incite jihad in Persia and Afghanistan, Grey (Foreign Secretary) and other politicians encouraged a further 100-mile push to Baghdad. The CIGS Murray thought this logistically unwise, but Kitchener advised the Dardanelles Committee (21 October) that Baghdad be seized for the sake of prestige, then abandoned.

Enver Pasha worried about the possible fall of Baghdad. He realised the mistake of underestimating the importance of the Mesopotamian campaign. He ordered the 35th Division and Mehmet Fazıl Pasha to return to Mosul, their old location. The 38th Division was reconstituted. The Sixth Army was created on 5 October 1915, and its commander was a 72-year-old German general, Colmar von der Goltz. Von der Goltz was a famous military historian who had written several classic books on military operations. He had also spent many years working as a military adviser in the Ottoman Empire. However, he was in Thrace commanding the Ottoman First Army and would not reach the theatre for some time. Colonel Nureddin the former commander of the Iraq Area Command was still in charge on the ground.

On 22 November, Townshend and Nureddin fought a battle at Ctesiphon, a town 25 miles south of Baghdad. The conflict lasted five days. The battle was a stalemate as both the Ottomans and the British ended up retreating from the battlefield. Townshend concluded that a full scale retreat was necessary. However, Nureddin realised the British were retreating and cancelled his retreat, then followed the British. Townshend withdrew his division in good order back to Kut-al-Amara. He halted and fortified the position. Nureddin pursued with his forces. He tried to encircle the British with his XVIII Corps composed of the 45th Division, 51st Division and 2nd Tribal Cavalry Brigade. The exhausted and depleted British force was urged back to the defences of Kut-al-Amara. The retreat finalised on 3 December. Nureddin encircled the British at Kut-al-Amara, and sent other forces down river to prevent the British from marching to the relief of the garrison.

On 7 December, the siege of Kut began. From the Ottoman perspective the siege prevented the Sixth Army from performing other operations. From the British perspective defending Kut, as opposed to retreating back to Basra, was a mistake since Kut was isolated. It could be defended, but it could not be resupplied. Von der Goltz helped the Ottoman forces build defensive positions around Kut. The Sixth Army was reorganised into two corps, the XIII and the XVIII. Nureddin Pasha gave command to Von der Goltz. With the reorganisation, the Sixth Army laid siege to the British. New fortified positions established down river fended off any attempt to rescue Townshend. Townshend suggested an attempt to break out, but this was initially rejected by Sir John Nixon; however he relented. Nixon established a relief force under the command of General Aylmer. General Aylmer made three major attempts to break the siege, but each effort was unsuccessful.

1916
On 20 January, Enver Pasha replaced Nureddin Pasha with Colonel Halil Kut (Khalil Pasha). Nureddin Pasha did not want to work with a German general. He sent a telegram to the War Ministry "The Iraq Army has already proven that it does not need the military knowledge of Goltz Pasha ..." After the first failure, General Nixon was replaced by General Lake. British forces received small quantities of supplies from the air. These drops were not enough to feed the garrison, though. Halil Kut forced the British to choose between starving and surrendering, though in the meantime they would try to lift the siege.

Between January and March 1916, both Townshend and Aylmer launched several attacks in an attempt to lift the siege. In sequence, the attacks took place at the Battle of Sheikh Sa'ad, the Battle of the Wadi, the Battle of Hanna, and the Battle of Dujaila Redoubt. These series of British attempts to break through the encirclement did not succeed and their costs were heavy. Both sides suffered high casualties. In February, XIII Corps received 2nd Infantry Division as a reinforcement. Food and hopes were running out for Townshend in Kut-al-Amara. Disease was spreading rapidly and could not be cured.

On 19 April Field Marshal Von der Goltz died of cholera. On 24 April, an attempt by the paddle steamer Julnar to re-supply the town by river failed. With that there was no way the British could resupply Kut. Rather than wait for reinforcements, Townshend surrendered on 29 April 1916. The remaining force in Kut-al-Amara of 13,164 soldiers became captives of the Ottomans.

The British viewed the loss of Kut as a humiliating defeat. It had been many years since such a large body of British Army soldiers had surrendered to an enemy. Also this loss followed only four months after the British defeat at the Battle of Gallipoli. Nearly all the British commanders involved in the failure to rescue Townshend were removed from command. The Ottomans proved they were good at holding defensive positions against superior forces.

The British refused to let the defeat at Kut stand. Further attempts to advance in Mesopotamia were ordered by the politicians on the War Committee (18 September), including Curzon and Chamberlain, who argued that there would be no net savings in troops if a passive policy in the Middle East encouraged Muslim unrest in India, Persia and Afghanistan, and despite the opposition of Robertson.

A major problem for the British was the lack of logistical infrastructure. When ships arrived at Basra, they had to be unloaded by small boats which then unloaded their cargo which was then stored in warehouses, which there were not enough of in Basra. Ships often sat for days waiting to be unloaded. Then supplies had to be sent north along the river in shallow draft river steamers because there were almost no roads north. Usually the amount of supplies being sent north was barely adequate to supply the forces in place. A plan to build a railway was rejected by the Indian Government in 1915, but after Kut it was approved. After the defeat at Kut, the British made a major effort to improve the ability to move men and equipment into theatre, and keep them supplied. The port at Basra was greatly improved so that ships could be quickly unloaded. Good roads were built around Basra. Rest camps and supply dumps were created to receive men and material from the port. More and better river steamers were put into service moving supplies up river. New hospitals were also set up to better care for the sick and wounded. As a result, the British were able to bring more troops and equipment to the front lines and keep them properly supplied for a new offensive.

The new commander, General Maude, with secret orders from Robertson not to attempt to take Baghdad, was given additional reinforcements and equipment. For the next six months he trained and organised his army. At the same time, the Ottoman Sixth Army was growing weaker. Khalil Pasha received very few replacements, and ended up disbanding the weak 38th Division and used its soldiers as replacements for his other divisions, the 46th, 51st, 35th, and 52nd. Robertson changed his mind when it seemed that the Russians might advance to Mosul, removing any Turkish threat to Mesopotamia, and authorised Maude to attack in December 1916.

1917

Maude's offensive was launched on 13 December 1916. The British advanced up both sides of the Tigris river, forcing the Ottoman army out of a number of fortified positions along the way. General Maude's offensive was methodical, organised, and successful. Khalil Pasha was able to concentrate most of his forces against Maude near Kut. However, Maude switched his advance to the other bank of the Tigris, bypassing most of the Ottoman forces. The Ottoman XVIII Corps escaped destruction only by fighting some desperate rear guard actions. It did lose quite a bit of equipment and supplies. The British occupied Kut and continued to advance up the Tigris.

By early March, the British were at the outskirts of Baghdad, and the Baghdad garrison, under the direct command of the Governor of Baghdad province Halil Kut (Khalil Pasha), tried to stop them on the Diyala river. General Maude outmanoeuvred the Ottoman forces, destroyed an Ottoman regiment and captured the Ottoman defensive positions. Khalil Pasha retreated in disarray out of the city. On 11 March 1917, the British entered Baghdad and colonial sources claim the Iraqi people greeted them as liberators. The British Indian Army played a significant role in the capture of Baghdad. Amidst the confusion of the retreat a large part of the Ottoman army (some 15,000 soldiers) were captured. A week after the city fell, General Maude issued the oft-quoted Proclamation of Baghdad, which contained the famous line "our armies do not come into your cities and lands as conquerors or enemies, but as liberators".

Khalil Pasha withdrew his battered Sixth Army up river and established his headquarters in Mosul. He had about 30,000 total troops with which to oppose Maude. In April, he received the 2nd Infantry Division, but overall the Ottoman strategic position was bad in the spring of 1917. After the capture of Baghdad, Maude stopped his advance. He felt his supply lines were too long, conditions in the summer made campaigning difficult and he had been denied reinforcements he felt he needed.

General Maude died of cholera on 18 November. He was replaced by General William Marshall who halted operations for the winter.

1918

The British resumed their offensive in late February 1918 capturing Hīt and Khan al Baghdadi in March, and Kifri in April. In March 1918, Britain faced an uprising by a rebel organisation called Jam'iya al-Nahda al-Islamiya in Najaf, and laid siege to the city until May, when the rebels surrendered. For the rest of the 1918, the British had to move troops to the Sinai and Palestine Campaign in support of the Battle of Megiddo. General Marshall moved some of the forces east in support of General Lionel Dunsterville's operations in Persia during the summer of 1918. His very powerful army was "astonishingly inactive, not only in the hot season but through most of the cold". The fight in Mesopotamia was not wanted any more.

Negotiation of armistice conditions between the Allies and the Ottoman Empire began with the turn of October. General Marshall, following instructions from the War Office that "every effort was to be made to score as heavily as possible on the Tigris before the whistle blew", went on the offensive for the last time. General Alexander Cobbe commanded a British force from Baghdad on 23 October 1918. Within two days it covered 120 kilometres, reaching the Little Zab River, where it met and engaged Ismail Hakki Bey's Sixth Army, most of which was captured in the resulting Battle of Sharqat.

Armistice of Mudros, October
On 30 October 1918, the Armistice of Mudros was signed and both parties accepted their current positions. General Marshall accepted the surrender of Khalil Pasha and the Ottoman 6th Army on the same day, but Cobbe did not hold his current position as the armistice required, and continued to advance on Mosul in the face of Turkish protests. British troops marched unopposed into the city on the 14 November 1918. The ownership of Mosul Province and its rich oil fields became an international issue.

The war in Mesopotamia was over on 14 November 1918. It was 15 days after the Armistice and one day after the occupation of Constantinople.

Aftermath

With British Indian forces already on the ground, the British imported civil servants from India who had previous knowledge and experience of running a colonial government. The expulsion of the Ottomans from the region shook the centuries-old power balance. Arabs who believed that the Ottoman expulsion would lead to greater independence, and fought against the Ottoman forces along the Allies, faced another dilemma. They were disappointed with the arrangements regarding the establishment of British Mandate of Mesopotamia.

Three important anticolonial secret societies had been formed in the region during 1918 and 1919. At Najaf, Jamiyat an Nahda al Islamiya (The League of the Islamic Awakening) was organised. Al Jamiya al Wataniya al Islamiya (The Muslim National League) was formed with the object of organising and mobilising the population for major resistance. In February 1919, in Baghdad, a coalition of Shia merchants, Sunni teachers and civil servants, Sunni and Shia ulama, and Iraqi officers formed the Haras al Istiqlal (the Guardians of Independence). The Istiqlal had member groups in Karbala, Najaf, Kut, and Hillah. The British were in a precarious situation with the Issue of Mosul. They were adopting almost desperate measures to protect their interests. The Iraqi revolt against the British developed just after they declared their authority. It was put down by the RAF Iraq Command during the summer of 1920.

The Ottoman parliament mostly accepted the cession of the region, but they had a different view on the issue of Mosul. They declared the Misak-ı Milli. Misak-ı Milli stated that the Mosul Province was a part of their heartland, based on a common past, history, concept of morals and laws. Presumably, from a British perspective, if Mustafa Kemal Atatürk succeeded in securing the stability in his efforts to establish Republic of Turkey, he would have turned his attention to recovering Mosul and penetrate into Mesopotamia, where the native population would probably join him. The British Foreign Secretary attempted to disclaim any existence of oil in the Mosul area. On 23 January 1923, Lord Curzon argued that the existence of oil was no more than hypothetical. However, according to Armstrong, "England wanted oil. Mosul and Kurds were the key."

Casualties

The British Empire forces suffered 85,197 battle casualties in Mesopotamia. There were also 820,418 hospitalisations for non-battle causes, mostly sickness. Of those, 16,712 died, 634,889 were treated and put back on duty in-theater, and 154,343 were permanently evacuated from the theatre. Those evacuated accounted for some 18.8% of total non-battle casualties, while those who died were 2%. By comparison, 49% of those wounded in battle (26,814 men) were evacuated, and 8.9% (5,281) died. Thousands more died out of theatre from injuries and sickness incurred here, or died in Ottoman captivity. Total British military deaths in the Mesopotamian Campaign, including from the latter causes, were 38,842 (1,434 officers and 37,408 men), including 28,578 from sickness and other non-battle causes (including prisoners). The unusually high ratio of non-battle to battle casualties in Mesopotamia, and the unusually high incidence of permanent losses among non-battle casualties had much to do with the geography of the area of operations. It was unhygienic, extremely hot in the summer, extremely cold in the winter, composed primarily of either sandy deserts or marshes, and was underdeveloped, meaning men had to be transported large distances for medical attention.

The Ottomans suffered 325,000 casualties on the Mesopotamian Campaign. Deaths from disease were double the Ottoman deaths in battle in the First World War and greater than this in Mesopotamia. Ottoman irrecoverable battle casualties totalled 55,858 (13,069 KIA, 22,385 WIA, 20,404 POW). They were divided up as follows:
 Basra 1914: 1,400 (100 KIA, 200 WIA, 1,200 POW)
 Qurna 1914: 1,495 (150 KIA, 300 WIA, 1,045 POW)
 Shaiba 1915: 6,700 (2,000 KIA, 4,000 WIA, 700 POW)
 1st Kut 1915: 5,200 (1,600 KIA, 2,400 WIA, 1,200 POW)
 Ctesiphon 1915: 14,700 (4,500 KIA, 9,000 WIA, 1,200 POW)
 Siege of Kut 1915/1916: 4,000 (1,600 KIA, 2,400 WIA)
 Relief of Kut 1916: 3,541 (619 KIA, 1,585 WIA, 1,337 POW)
 2nd Kut/Baghdad 1917: 6,000 (2,000 KIA, 4,000 WIA)
 Mesopotamia 1918 total: 12,822 (500 KIA, 1,000 WIA, 11,322 POW)

The WIA figures only include irrecoverable losses (crippled or died of wounds). Going by Erickson's estimates, the total of wounded outnumbered seriously wounded by 2.5:1 for the war. Applying that same ratio to the Mesopotamia Campaign produces a total battle casualty count of about 89,500 (13,069 KIA, 56,000 WIA, 20,404 POW). By the end of 1918 the British had deployed 350,000–410,000 men into the theatre, 112,000 of them front-line troops. The vast majority of the British empire forces in this campaign were recruited from India.

Battles of the campaign

 Fao Landing
 Fall of Basra
 Battle of Qurna
 Battle of Shaiba
 Battle of Es Sinn
 Battle of Ctesiphon
 Siege of KutAttempts to Relieve Kut:
 Battle of Sheikh Sa'ad
 Battle of the Wadi
 Battle of Hanna
 Battle of Dujaila Redoubt
 First Battle of Kut
 Second Battle of Kut
 Fall of Baghdad
 Samarra offensive
 Battle of Jebel Hamlin
 Battle of Istabulat
 Battle of Ramadi
 Action of Khan Baghdadi
 Battle of Sharqat

See also

 Ottoman Empire
 Dissolution of the Ottoman Empire
 Tanzimat
 Second Constitutional Era of the Ottoman Empire
 Young Turks

Notes

References

Further reading

External links

 Herzog, Christoph: Mesopotamian Front, in: 1914-1918-online. International Encyclopedia of the First World War.
 Mesopotamia Campaign: The Long, Long Trail
 Mesopotamia Campaign: CWGC
 U.S. Military Academy map of the 1915 Campaign
 U.S. Military Academy map of the Siege of Kut
 Mesopotamia pages of '.Turkey in WW1'. web site

 
Campaigns and theatres of World War I
Military campaigns involving the United Kingdom
Military campaigns and theatres of World War I involving the Ottoman Empire
Military history of Iraq
20th century in Iraq
20th century in Kuwait
History of Kuwait
Iraq–United Kingdom relations
Battles of World War I involving New Zealand